Blepharomastix primolalis is a moth in the family Crambidae. It was described by William Schaus in 1924. It is found in Suriname.

The wingspan is about 14 mm. The wings are white with honey-yellow markings. The basal half of the costa of the forewings is honey yellow.

References

Moths described in 1924
Blepharomastix